Anandi Art Creations  is an Indian film production company . Producer of this production house  is P. Kiran & he also won two Filmfare Awards

Film production

References

External links
  Anandi Art Creations on YouTube

Film production companies based in Hyderabad, India
Year of establishment missing